Sayyid Ali Sari was the Mar'ashi ruler of Amul and Sari from 1406 to 1417. He was a son of Kamal al-Din I, and was succeeded by his son Sayyid Murtada.

References

Sources 
 

15th-century monarchs in the Middle East
15th-century Iranian people
Mar'ashis
1417 deaths
Year of birth unknown